César Luis Bojórquez Zapata is a Mexican politician, affiliated with the National Action Party (PAN) and former Mayor of Mérida, Yucatán for the period 2007 to 2010

References 

Living people
National Action Party (Mexico) politicians
Municipal presidents of Mérida
Year of birth missing (living people)
21st-century Mexican politicians